Datacopia is a freemium tool that automatically generates charts and infographics from structured and unstructured data.

Context 
Representing data using charts is a difficult task from two perspectives.  The first is that it is not always clear which chart type best represents a dataset. The second, and more difficult of the two, is understanding what useful information even exists in the data before it can be visualized.

Datacopia attempts to resolve these difficulties by automating both the data analysis and chart selection processes.

Technology 
Datacopia is built in HTML5 and runs on any platform with a browser that supports the Html5 canvas element.  It makes use of D3.js and the NVD3 library to provide its interactive graphics.  It uses the Heroku PaaS stack.

Datacopia allows generated charts to be posted to social media sites and blogs.

Datacopia offers an API that allows developers to embed Datacopia functionality within their software and websites.  This API is already used by the Qiqqa research management software to automatically turn tables of results in PDFs into charts.

References

Data visualization software
Plotting software
Graph drawing software